Barh Sara is one of 3 departments which make up the region of Mandoul in southern Chad. Its capital is Moïssala.

It is divided into three sub-prefectures:
 Moïssala 
 Bouna  
 Dembo

Departments of Chad
Mandoul Region